2011–12 Estonian Cup is the twenty-second season of the Estonian football knockout tournament organized by the Estonian Football Association. The winner qualified for the first qualifying round of the 2012–13 UEFA Europa League.

Round of 128
The draw was made by Estonian Football Association on 15 June.

1 Luunja used an ineligible player, the original score was 1–0, but was awarded to Elva as 1–x.

Round of 64
The draw was made on 21 July.

Round of 32
The draw was made on 4 August.

Round of 16
The draw was made on 6 September.

Quarter-finals
The draw was made on 8 March 2012, at the opening of new league season.  The matches will be played on 24–25 April.

Semi-finals
The draw for semi-finals was held on 26 April 2012.

Final
The final will be held on 26 May 2012 at A. Le Coq Arena.

References

External links
 Official website 

Estonian Cup seasons
Cup
Cup
Estonian